Kaldfjorden may refer to several different places:

Kaldfjorden is the name of the central part of the large lake Sandvatnet/Kaldfjorden/Øyvatnet in Oppland county, Norway
Kaldfjorden, Troms, a fjord in the island of Kvaløya in Tromsø municipality, Troms county, Norway
Kaldfjorden, Finnmark, a fjord in the municipality of Nordkapp in Finnmark county, Norway